Major John Bernard Arbuthnot, MVO (17 May 1875, in London – 16 September 1950) was a British soldier, banker, and journalist.

Life
Arbuthnot was the son of Colonel George Arbuthnot and wife Caroline Emma Nepean Aitchison.

He was commissioned a second lieutenant in the Scots Guards on 18 July 1896, and promoted to the rank of lieutenant on 22 September 1898. Following the outbreak of the Second Boer War in late 1899, he was with the 2nd Battalion of his regiment as it left Southampton for South Africa on the SS Britannic in March 1900. On arrival, the battalion was attached to the 16th Infantry Brigade serving as part of the 8th Division under Sir Leslie Rundle. He fought with the 2nd battalion until the end of the war in May 1902. After his return to the United Kingdom, he was on 15 August 1902 appointed Aide-de-Camp to Sir Henry Arthur Blake, Governor of Hong Kong. Before departure for Hong Kong, he took part in the Coronation of King Edward VII and Queen Alexandra, and for this service was invested as a Member (fifth class) of the Royal Victorian Order (MVO) two days after the ceremony, on 11 August 1902. He was promoted to captain on 17 December 1902. He later served in the First World War, where he was mentioned in despatches, and reached the rank of major.

He was also a merchant banker.

As a journalist on the Daily Express, in 1917 he founded and was author to its By the Way column, writing it pseudonymously as 'Beachcomber', before he was promoted to deputy editor and passed the role to D. B. Wyndham-Lewis in 1919.

Family
In Hong Kong on 8 June 1903 he married Olive Blake (5 November 1875 - 12 September 1953), daughter of the Governor, Sir Henry Arthur Blake, and wife Edith Bernal Osborne. They had six children: 
 Irene Joan Grace Arbuthnot (25 April 1904 - Youghal, County Cork, 17 March 1997), explorer and author known as Joan Arbuthnot, wrote the book More Profit Than Gold, published in 1935
 David George Arbuthnot (7 April 1905 - 14 November 1985), married firstly on 17 May 1933 Elisabeth Kemeys-Tynte, 10th Baroness Wharton, and had female issue, and married secondly on 25 April 1946 Barbara Margherita Chiappini (? - 1975), daughter of Francis Chiappini and widow second wife on 20 April 1929 of Percy Seymour Douglas-Hamilton (2 October 1875 - 6 February 1940), without issue
 Group Captain Terence John Arbuthnot (8 October 1906 - Kensington, London, 31 December 1995), married on 20 April 1937 Karin Gunborg Sundgren, daughter of Carl Adolph Sundgren
 Commander Bernard Kieran Charles Arbuthnot (8 November 1909 - 14 September 1975), married on 15 April 1939 Rosemary Harold Thompson, daughter of Lt.-Col. Harold Thompson
 Major Richard Henry Myles Arbuthnot (17 August 1911 - killed on active service, Italy, 16 October 1943), married on 28 April 1939 Marjorie Helen Miller, daughter of Ralph Miller
 Patricia Evangeline Anne Arbuthnot (17 March 1914 - 6 October 1989), married firstly on 10 October 1933 Arthur Cecil Byron, son of Cecil Byron, by whom she had a son Darrell Byron, who died in Ireland aged two, divorcing in 1940, and married secondly in 1940 Francis Claud Cockburn of Brook Lodge, Youghal, County Cork (Peking, 12 April 1904 - 15 December 1981), and had issue

References

1875 births
John Bernard Arbuthnot
Scots Guards officers
British Army personnel of World War I
Members of the Royal Victorian Order
1950 deaths
British Army personnel of the Second Boer War
British expatriates in Hong Kong